Doris Self (September 18, 1925 – October 3, 2006) was a video game competitor who gained recognition in the 1980s as "the world's oldest video game champion". In the 2007 Guinness World Records, Self was recognized as the world's oldest video game competitor. The documentary film The King of Kong: A Fistful of Quarters detailed Self's quest to recover her standing as the "oldest champion" from John Lawton, the 72-year-old co-founder of the Funspot Family Fun Center in Weirs Beach, New Hampshire, who had captured the world title on Depthcharge

Career
On July 1, 1984, Doris Self made video game history when, at the age of 58, she gained recognition as the "world's oldest video game champion". As a competitor on Q*bert at Twin Galaxies' 1984 Video Game Masters Tournament, Self scored a world record mark of 1,112,300 points on Twin Galaxies' Tournament Settings (TGTS) – the most difficult settings that allow for only five-men in the game.

In 2005, Self traveled to London to continue her quest to regain the Q*bert World Record. She was one of the featured stars at the Classic Gaming Expo-UK, held Saturday, August 13, 2005, in Croydon, United Kingdom.

During the weekend of April 6–9, 2006, Self faced-off against Kelly Tharp, of Sellersburg, Indiana, in a highly publicized Q*bert contest, held at Apollo Amusements in Pompano Beach, Florida. Titled "The King vs The Queen Q*bert Smackdown," the event was filmed as part of the King of Kong documentary.

In the 2007 Guinness World Records, Self was recognized as the world's oldest video game competitor. In The King of Kong, her quest to recover her standing as the "oldest champion" was documented, as she tried to regain the title back from John Lawton, the 72-year-old co-founder of the Funspot Family Fun Center in Weirs Beach, New Hampshire, who had captured the world title on Depthcharge.

Personal life
Self's Q*bert career was preceded by a flight attendant career. At the age of 19, she was among the first female flight attendants at Eastern Air Lines, graduating in 1945 as a member of Eastern Air Lines’ first class of airline stewardesses. And, in 1954, while working with legendary air ace Eddie Rickenbacker, she co-organized "The Silver Liners", the first association for ex-stewardesses. Today, the DC-3 she used to fly on in the 1940s is hanging from the ceiling of the National Air and Space Museum in Washington, D.C.

Self had still been practicing and preparing for her next world record attempt on Q*bert when she died from injuries suffered in an automobile accident in Plantation, Florida on October 3, 2006.

References

1925 births
2006 deaths
American esports players
Sportspeople from Broward County, Florida
Flight attendants
Eastern Air Lines
Road incident deaths in Florida
Women esports players
People from Plantation, Florida